Puerto Rico and the Virgin Islands lie at the boundary between the Caribbean and North American plates, making these territories prone to earthquakes. This is a highly active seismic region both surrounded and traversed by numerous fault lines; to the north, the North American plate subducts into the Caribbean plate, while a number of transform fault lines cross the main island of Puerto Rico diagonally from southeast to northeast. Puerto Rico and the Virgin Islands are also located on a microplate that is continuously being trampled by the subduction zone to the north. Puerto Rico is constantly prone to experiencing major earthquakes, superior to 7.0, at any moment.

History 

The region has been seismically active since ancient times. The Great Northern and Great Southern fault zones that cross the main island of Puerto Rico laterally have been active since the Eocene epoch. Earthquakes in the region have been recorded since the early 17th century and some of the first seismic activity in the Americas were recorded first in Puerto Rico and Hispaniola. One of the first recorded earthquakes in the region was on September 8, 1615, which originated in the Dominican Republic region and caused damages throughout the island. Earthquakes have been studied and recorded in Puerto Rico since the 20th century. The Puerto Rico Seismic Network (Red Sísmica de Puerto Rico or RSPR), which is contained within the department of Geology of the University of Puerto Rico, Mayagüez, was established in 1974 by the United States Geological Survey (USGS) and the former Puerto Rico Electric Power Authority (PREPA). It was established with the goal evaluating seismic features for the purpose of building nuclear power plants in the region. Its mission today is to detect, process and study seismic activity within the Puerto Rico region. The RSPR operates 25 seismometers throughout Puerto Rico, the US Virgin Islands and the British Virgin Islands. Two of these seismometers are owned by the United States Army Corps of Engineers.

On average, there are about 5 earthquakes recorded per day and about 3 earthquakes with magnitude 5.0 higher recorded per year in the region. Given that most of the active faults are located at sea, most earthquakes in the region do not cause loss of life or significant damage, and significant destructive earthquakes that occur in Puerto Rico are rare. Most large earthquakes have historically occurred at sea which makes the area susceptible to destructive tsunamis. The last tsunami to cause significant damages in Puerto Rico was on October 11, 1918 which was generated by the 1918 Aguadilla earthquake. There have been more recent tsunami events, such as in 1946, which did not cause significant damage to the island. The last earthquakes to cause loss of life were the 2020 southwestern Puerto Rico sequence of earthquakes which caused 4 deaths. The last earthquake to cause significant damage and loss of life in the Virgin Islands occurred in 1867; this earthquake generated a tsunami that affected the Virgin Islands and Puerto Rico.

Notable earthquakes in Puerto Rico and the Virgin Islands

See also 
 Geology of Puerto Rico
 List of earthquakes
 United States Geological Survey (USGS)

References

External links 
 Puerto Rico Seismic Network / Red Sísmica de Puerto Rico – RSPR
 Puerto Rico Earthquakes - USGS

Earthquakes in Puerto Rico
Earthquakes
Natural disasters in Puerto Rico
Lists of earthquakes

Puerto Rico
earthquakes, Puerto Rico